White Fox is a Japanese animation studio with several projects having closely related comics/manga.

White Fox may also refer to:
 White fox or Arctic fox, an animal native to Arctic regions
 A white-furred red fox
 White Fox, Saskatchewan
 White Fox (album), a 2010 album by Ham Sandwich
 "White Foxes", a 2012 song by Susanne Sundfør
 John Hargrave or White Fox, British youth leader and politician
 White Fox, a Marvel Comics character with the alter ego Ami Han

See also

 White–Fox House Archeological Site